Majorens oppasser is a 1964 Danish comedy film directed by Sven Methling and starring Dirch Passer.

Cast
 Dirch Passer - Thomas Edison Hansen
 Ove Sprogøe - Major Clausen
 Paul Hagen - 21, Sørensen
 Judy Gringer - Lise Clausen
 Karl Stegger - Oberst Madsen
 Ghita Nørby - Thomas' mor
 Sigrid Horne-Rasmussen - Oberstinde Madsen
 Hanne Borchsenius - Sekretær Frk. Severinsen
 Ebbe Langberg - Psykolog
 Bjørn Spiro
 Ole Monty - Læge
 Bent Vejlby - Sergent
 Holger Vistisen - Menig soldat
 Bruno Tyron
 Poul Thomsen - Oversergent Mikkelsen
 Svend Aage Gotfredsen - Menig Soldat
 Carl Ottosen

References

External links

1964 films
Danish comedy films
1960s Danish-language films
1964 comedy films
Films directed by Sven Methling